Zinc finger protein 592 is a protein that in humans is encoded by the ZNF592 gene.

Function

This gene is thought to play a role in a complex developmental pathway and the regulation of genes involved in cerebellar development. Mutations in this gene have been associated with autosomal recessive spinocerebellar ataxia.

References

Further reading 

Human proteins